

Albert Hermoso Farras (born 28 August 1978) is a Spanish Olympic eventing rider. He competed at the 2016 Summer Olympics in Rio de Janeiro where he was eliminated during the cross-country stage of the individual eventing competition.

Hermoso Farras also participated at the 2014 World Equestrian Games and at four editions of European Eventing Championships (in 2009, 2011, 2013 and 2015). His best result is 8th place in team competition, which he achieved thrice.

References

External links
 
 

Living people
1978 births
Spanish male equestrians
Equestrians at the 2016 Summer Olympics
Olympic equestrians of Spain